House of Evil (Serenata macabra/ Macabre Serenade) a.k.a. Dance of Death, is a 1968 Mexican horror film directed by Luis Enrique Vergara and Jack Hill. It stars Boris Karloff and Julissa. It was filmed in May 1968, but released theatrically in 1972, three years after Karloff had died.

House of Evil is one of four low-budget Mexican horror films Karloff made in a package deal with Mexican producer Luis Enrique Vergara. The others are Isle of the Snake People, The Incredible Invasion, and Fear Chamber. Karloff's scenes for all four films were directed by Jack Hill in Los Angeles in the spring of 1968. The films were then completed in Mexico.

Plot synopsis
Morhenge Mansion, 1900: The dying Matthias Morteval invites his dysfunctional relatives to his home for a will reading. However, he dies, and soon the relatives are being murdered one by one by his living robotic toys.

Cast
Boris Karloff as Matthias Morteval
Julissa as Lucy Durant
Andrés García as Beasley
José Ángel Espinosa 'Ferrusquilla' as Dr. Emery Horvath
Beatriz Baz as Cordelia Rash
Quintín Bulnes as Ivar Morteval
Manuel Alvarado as Morgenstein Morteval
Arturo Fernández as Fodor

References

External links

1968 films
1968 horror films
Mexican horror films
English-language Mexican films
Films set in country houses
1960s English-language films
1960s Mexican films